Martin Cooper (born December 26, 1928) is an American engineer. He is a pioneer in the wireless communications industry, especially in radio spectrum management, with eleven patents in the field.

On April 3, 1973, he placed the first public call from a handheld portable cell phone at Motorola. Cooper reprised the first handheld cellular mobile phone (distinct from the car phone) in 1973 and led the team that re-developed it and brought it to market in 1983. He is considered the "father of the (handheld) cell phone" and is also cited as the first person in history to make a handheld cellular phone call in public, namely in 1973. 

Cooper is co-founder of numerous communications companies with his wife and business partner Arlene Harris; He is co-founder and current Chairman of Dyna LLC, in Del Mar, California. Cooper also sits on committees supporting the U.S. Federal Communications Commission and the United States Department of Commerce.

In 2010, Cooper was elected a member of the National Academy of Engineering for leadership in the creation and deployment of the cellular portable hand-held telephone.

Education 

Cooper was born in Chicago to Ukrainian Jewish immigrants. He graduated from Illinois Institute of Technology (IIT) in 1950 and served as a submarine officer during the Korean War. 

In 1957, he earned his master's degree from IIT in electrical engineering and in 2004 received an honorary doctorate degree from IIT. He serves on the university's board of trustees.

Career

Motorola 

Cooper left his first job at Teletype Corporation in Chicago in 1954 and joined Motorola, Inc. (Schaumburg, Illinois) as a senior development engineer in the mobile equipment group. He developed products including the first cellular-like portable handheld police radio system, produced for the Chicago police department in 1967.

By the early 1970s, Cooper headed Motorola's communications systems division. Here he conceived of the first portable cellular phone in 1973 and led the 10-year process of bringing it to market. Car phones had been in limited use in large U.S. cities since the 1930s but Cooper championed cellular telephony for more general personal, portable communications. He believed the cellular phone should be a "personal telephone – something that would represent an individual so you could assign a number; not to a place, not to a desk, not to a home, but to a person." Although it has been stated that Cooper's vision for the device was inspired by Captain James T. Kirk using his Communicator on the television show Star Trek, Cooper himself later said that his actual inspiration was Dick Tracy's wrist radio.

Top management at Motorola supported Cooper's mobile phone concept, investing $100 million between 1973 and 1993 before any revenues were realized. Cooper assembled a team that designed and assembled a product in less than 90 days. That original handset, called the DynaTAC 8000x (DYNamic Adaptive Total Area Coverage) weighed 2.5 pounds (1.1 kg), measured 10 inches (25 cm) long and was dubbed "the brick" or "the shoe" phone. A very substantial part of the DynaTAC was the battery, which weighed four to five times more than a modern cell phone. The phone had only 30 minutes of talk time before requiring a 10-hour recharge but according to Cooper, "The battery lifetime wasn't really a problem because you couldn't hold that phone up for that long!" By 1983 and after four iterations, the handset was reduced to half its original weight.

Cooper is the lead inventor named on "radio telephone system" filed on October 17, 1973, with the U.S. Patent Office and later issued as U.S. Patent 3,906,166. John Francis Mitchell, Motorola's Chief of Portable Communication Products (and Cooper's Manager and Mentor) and the engineers who worked for Cooper and Mitchell are also named on the patent.

On April 3, 1973, Cooper and Mitchell demonstrated two working phones to the media and to passers-by prior to walking into a scheduled press conference at the New York City Hilton in midtown Manhattan. Standing on Sixth avenue near the Hilton, Cooper made the first handheld cellular phone call in public from the prototype DynaTAC. The call connected him to a base station Motorola had installed on the roof of the Burlington House (now the AllianceBernstein Building) and into the AT&T land-line telephone system. Reporters and onlookers watched as Cooper dialed the number of his chief competitor Dr. Joel S. Engel at AT&T. "Joel, this is Marty. I'm calling you from a cell phone, a real handheld portable cell phone." That public demonstration landed the DynaTAC on the July 1973 cover of Popular Science Magazine. As Cooper recalls from the experience:  "I made numerous calls, including one where I crossed the street while talking to a New York radio reporter – probably one of the most dangerous things I have ever done in my life."

That first cell phone began a fundamental technology and communications market shift to making phone calls to a person instead of to a place. Bell Labs had introduced the idea of cellular communications in 1947, but their first systems were limited to car phones which required roughly 30 pounds (12 kg) of equipment in the trunk. Motorola gained Federal Communications Commission (FCC) approval for cellular licenses to be assigned to competing entities and prevented an AT&T monopoly on cellular service.

Cooper worked at Motorola for 29 years; building and managing both its paging and cellular businesses. He also led the creation of trunked mobile radio, quartz crystals, oscillators, liquid crystal displays, piezo-electric components, Motorola A. M. stereo technology and various mobile and portable two-way radio product lines.

Cooper rose to Vice-President and Corporate Director of Research and Development at Motorola. In addition to his work on the mobile cellular phone, he was instrumental in expanding the technology of pagers from use within a single building to use across multiple cities. Cooper also worked with inventor Clifford L. Rose to fix a flaw in quartz crystals used in Motorola's radios which encouraged the company to mass-produce the first crystals used in wrist watches.

Cellular Business Systems

Dyna LLC 

Cooper and his wife Arlene Harris founded Dyna LLC in 1986 as a home base for their developmental and support activities for the new companies, Subscriber Computing Inc., Cellular Pay Phone, Inc. (CPPI), SOS Wireless Communications and Accessible Wireless; the later two of which together created the underpinning for the creation of GreatCall, were all launched from Dyna LLC.

From his Dyna headquarters Cooper continues to write and lecture about wireless communications, technological innovation, the Internet and R&D management. He serves on industry, civic and national governmental groups including the U.S. Department of Commerce Spectrum Advisory Committee that advises the Secretary of Commerce of the United States on spectrum policy and the Federal Communications Commission's (FCC) Technological Advisory Council.

GreatCall, Inc 

In 1986 Cooper co-founded Cellular Payphone Inc. (CPPI), the parent company of GreatCall, Inc., Innovator of the Jitterbug cell phone (in partnership with Samsung). GreatCall is the first complete end-to-end value-added service provider in the cellular industry to focus on simplicity with its primary emphasis on senior citizens.

Arraycomm 

In 1992 Cooper co-founded Arraycomm a developer of software for mobile antenna technologies. Under his leadership, the Company grew from a seed-funded startup in San Jose, California, into the world leader in smart antenna technology with 400 patents issued or pending, worldwide.

Energous.com 

Cooper joined the board of directors from 2015 to 2019.

Cooper's law 

Cooper found that the ability to transmit different radio communications simultaneously and in the same place has grown at the same pace since Guglielmo Marconi's first transmissions in 1895. This led Cooper to formulate the Law of Spectral Efficiency, otherwise known as Cooper's Law. The law states that the maximum number of voice conversations or equivalent data transactions that can be conducted in all of the useful radio spectrum over a given area doubles every 30 months.

Publications

Latest publications

"The Myth of Spectrum Scarcity" Position Paper, March 2010.
 
"Mobile WiMax – Fourth-Generation Wireless," Bechtel Communications Technical Journal, September 2007.
 
"The Need for Simplicity," in the anthology "Mobile Persuasion: 20 Perspectives on the Future of Behavior Change," published by Stanford University in 2007.
 
"Personal Communications in 2025" for Eta Kappa Nu Electrical and Computer Engineering Honor Society, Autumn 2005.

"Antennas Get Smart" in Scientific American, July 2003.
 
"Everyone is Wrong" in Technology Review, June 2001.

Awards and affiliations 

 Mensa
 1984 – IEEE Centennial Medal and Fellow
 1995 – Wharton Infosys Business Transformation Award
 1996 – Radio Club of America Fred Link Award and Life Fellow with the International Engineering Consortium
 2000 – "Red Herring" Magazine Top Ten Entrepreneurs of 2000
 2000 – RCR Wireless News Hall of Fame Inaugural Member
 2002 – American Computer Museum George Stibitz Computer and Communications Pioneer Award
 2002 – Wireless Systems Design Industry Leader Award 
 2006 – CITA Emerging Technologies Award
 2007 – Wireless World Research Forum Fellow
 2007 – Global Spec Great Moments Engineering Award
 2008 – CE Consumer Electronics Hall of Fame Award
 October 2008 – Wireless History Foundation, Top U.S. Wireless Innovators of All Time.
 2009 – Prince of Asturias Award for scientific and technical research.
 2009 – Life Trustee, Illinois Institute of Technology
 2010 – Radio Club of America, Lifetime Achievement Award
 October 2010 – Member, National Academy of Engineering
 2011 – Inaugural Mikhail Gorbachev: The Man Who Changed the World Awards Nominee
 2011 – Webby Award for Lifetime Achievement
 2012 – Washington Society of Engineers, Washington Award
 2013 – Charles Stark Draper Prize, National Academy of Engineering
 2013 – Marconi Prize
 2013 – Honorary doctorate awarded by the students and the rector of Hasselt University on the occasion of the university's 40th anniversary.
 2014 IEEE-Eta Kappa Nu Eminent Member 
 2019 – Leaves the Energous board of directors.

References

External links

 
 
 

American telecommunications industry businesspeople
American inventors
1928 births
Living people
People from Chicago
Illinois Institute of Technology alumni
United States Navy personnel of the Korean War
American people of Ukrainian-Jewish descent
Members of the United States National Academy of Engineering
Mensans
IEEE Centennial Medal laureates